Sex Workers Anonymous is a twelve-step program support group for those wanting to leave the sex industry, or recover from its effects.  Originally known as Prostitutes Anonymous, it was founded by Jody Williams in August 1987. The group is open to all, regardless of gender, age, race, religion, or nationality. They have phone support, meetings, mail support, and a recovery book and step guide available.

To assist sexual trafficking victims, Jody Williams formed Trafficking and Prostitution Services (TAPS) in October 2007.

References

External links
 

Sex worker organizations
Non-profit organizations based in the United States
Organizations established in 1987
Twelve-step programs